Anjuman Mufidul Islam ( Beneficial Assembly of Islam) is a Bangladeshi welfare organisation specially designed to enrich the livelihood of orphans and the distressed.

History
Sheikh Ibrahim Mohammed Dupley, a resident of Surat, formed Anjuman Mufidul Islam in Kolkata in 1905. Khawaja Nazimuddin, A. K. Fazlul Huq, Huseyn Shaheed Suhrawardy successfully directed the activities of this organisation as its president. After the Partition of India in 1947, the Anjuman's chief administrative officer SM Salahuddin along with officials such as Abdul Haque Faridi managed to set up a branch in SK Das Road, Gandaria, Dhaka in September 1947. Faridi was made the first president of Dhaka's Anjuman serving from 1947 to 1949. In 1950, the Anjuman became an independent organisation.

The Anjuman organised a movement for the education of poor Muslims, and established public libraries and arranged debates. In addition to these activities, its important work was to bury unclaimed Muslim dead bodies.

Mufleh R Osmani, a former Foreign Secretary ( 1993–1995) to the Govt of Bangladesh, is the current President having been elected in 2019.

Services
 Ambulance Service
 Burial Service
 Orphanage
 Educational Programmes

Orphanages
Presently there are 350 orphans lived in 9 orphanages as of 14 May 2019. Source: Anjuman Mufidul Islam. In the capital city and its adjacent area:

 Anjuman sheth ibrahim Muhammad Dupley Boys Home, Gendaria Dhaka. 83 boys live here.
 120 girls live in Anjuman ABMG Kibria Girls Home, Gendaria Dhaka. 
 Anjuman Jamil Hasmot-Ara Girls Home, Tolla Narayanganj. 32 Girls live here.
 Anjuman Azizul Islam girls home, Savar, Dhaka. 17 Girls live here. 
 Anjuman Dr. Rokshana Huda Girls Home, Tejgaon, Dhaka. 5 Girls live here.

Orphanages in the countryside:
 Anjuman Mufidul Islam Orphanage, EPZ Road, Tomsom Bridge, Comilla. 35 boys and 20 girls live here. Total 52
 Anjuman Mobarok Hossain Rotno Orphanage, DC Road, Pabna. 40 boys and 40 girls live here. Total 80.
 Anjuman Musa Mia Shishu shodon (Children's Home), Shatpai NetroKona. 20 Boys and 4 Girls live here. Total 60.
 Anjuman Mufidul Islam Anwara Zakaria, Orphanage, Hali City, Chittagong. 55 Boys and 100 Girls live here. Total 155.

Educational institutions
 Anjuman Jamilur Rahman Islamia Junior High School
 Anjuman Raihana Mahbub Junior High School
 Anjuman Mufidul Islam Technical Institute
Anjuman Ridwan Rahman Technical Institute
 Anjuman Raihana Mahbub Technical Institute
 Anjuman Mokhlesur Rahman Polytechnique Institute

Management board

Trustees
 Mufleh Rahman Osmani    President/Trustee
 Alhaj Md. Hasan Uddin Mollah
 M Hafizuddin Khan
 Alhaj Kazi Abul Bashar
 Mohammad Azim Buksh
 Lion Abdur Rashid (Rashed) M.J.F
 Shahidullah Minu,
 Prof. Md. Khalilur Rahman
 Alhaj Mohammad Aslam
 Md. Shamsul Haque
 Mr. Morshed Ahmed Chowdhury
 Mr. Mokhlesur Rahman.

Vice presidents
 Mr. A Q M Fazlul Bari
 Sayed Nazir Ahmed
 Alhaj Abdus Salam
 Mr. Shish Haydar Chowdhury
 Ambassador (Retd.) Alhaj Mohammad Mohsin
 Ambassador (Retd.) Dr. M. A Samad
 Ms Mitali Hossain
 Engg. Moid Rumi
 Mr. Golam Ashraf Talukder
 Mr. Golam Rahman
 Alhaj Fayejur Rahman

References

1905 establishments in India
Charities based in Bangladesh
Recipients of the Independence Day Award